Kirovsky Zavod is a station of the Saint Petersburg Metro on the Kirovsko-Vyborgskaya Line. It is named after the Kirov Plant which traditionally manufactured armaments. The station opened on 15 November 1955.

References

Saint Petersburg Metro stations
Railway stations in Russia opened in 1955
Railway stations located underground in Russia
Cultural heritage monuments of regional significance in Saint Petersburg